The Första kammaren (literally "First Chamber", often abbreviated 'FK') was the upper house of the bicameral Riksdag of Sweden between 1866 and 1970 that replaced the Riksdag of the Estates. During the bicameral period, the lower house of the Riksdag was the Andra kammaren (literally "the Second Chamber").  Both chambers had generally similar and parallel powers.

At the time of its abolition, the First Chamber had 151 members. These were indirectly elected  for eight-year terms of office, from amongst the county councils (landsting) and city councils (stadsfullmäktige), which formed electoral colleges, some of which holding elections every year, with local elections being held every four years in even years when elections to the Second Chamber were not due to be held.

During a large portion of the long tenure of power for the Social Democrats (between 1932 and 1976), the party remained in control of legislation thanks to its strong position in the First Chamber. If the two chambers made contradictory decisions in budgetary matters, they were required to meet in joint assembly to make a "coherent" decision on the issue. In other matters, no legislative outcomes could be established if the two houses were in disagreement, but issues could re-addressed by submitting a new proposal. Co-ordination between the two chambers was facilitated by the Riksdag having standing joint committees composed of members from both chambers.  This is rare for two-chamber systems, which generally only employ temporary joint mediation committees to resolve a dispute between the chambers, or reserve standing joint committees for very narrow functions.

See also
 History of the Riksdag

Literature
 Little encyclopaedia, publisher: Nordic AB, Malmö 1974, page 8, column 139 ff.
 Foreign political systems, Oxford University Press 1995, Rutger Lindahl (ed.)

References

 
Defunct upper houses
20th century in Sweden
Legislative buildings in Europe
Political history of Sweden
1866 establishments in Sweden
Politics of Sweden
Riksdag